Bon Tempe Lake is a reservoir in Marin County, California, managed by the Marin Municipal Water District. It is the widest lake in the Mount Tamalpais watershed, and on Lagunitas Creek. Beneath its dam is Alpine Lake. Lake Lagunitas is immediately to its east.

Built in 1948, with the construction of the earthen Bon Tempe Dam, the lake's name is an Americanization of the Bautunpi family name. The Bautunpi brothers ran a ranch and dairy that was removed with the creation of Bon Tempe and Alpine reservoirs.

Fishing and hiking are activities around the lake. Rainbow trout and both largemouth and smallmouth bass are caught in the lake. The California Office of Environmental Health Hazard Assessment released a warning regarding eating fish caught from this lake based on the elevated mercury level.

See also
List of dams and reservoirs in California
List of lakes in California
List of lakes in the San Francisco Bay Area

Notes

Reservoirs in Marin County, California
Mount Tamalpais
Reservoirs in California
Reservoirs in Northern California